is a passenger railway station in the city of Jōsō, Ibaraki Prefecture, Japan operated by the private railway company Kantō Railway.

Lines

Station layout
The station consists of a single side platform serving traffic in both directions. There is no station building, but only a shelter built onto the platform. The station is unattended.

Adjacent stations

History
Minami-Ishige Station was opened on 5 November 1931 as a station on the Jōsō Railroad, which became the Kantō Railway in 1965.

Passenger statistics
In fiscal 2017, the station was used by an average of 266 passengers daily).

Surrounding area
The station is located in a semi-rural area with few buildings nearby.

See also
 List of railway stations in Japan

References

External links

Kantō Railway Station Information 

Railway stations in Ibaraki Prefecture
Railway stations in Japan opened in 1931
Jōsō, Ibaraki